Hachijō can refer to:

Hachijō in Tokyo, Japan 
 The island Hachijōjima (八丈島)
 The town Hachijō, Tokyo, within Tokyo, Japan, which governs Hachijōjima and Hachijōkojima.
 Hachijo dialects, the dialects of the Japanese language native to these islands

Hachijō in Kyoto, Japan 
 literally means eighth street in Japanese.
 —a numbered east–west street in Heian-kyō (Kyoto), which runs just south of Kyoto Station
 —a Japanese kuge family descended from the